Julio Fuentes may refer to:

 Julio M. Fuentes (born 1946), United States Circuit Judge
 Julio Fuentes Serrano (1954–2001), Spanish journalist killed in Afghanistan
 Julio Fuentes (pentathlete) (born 1960), Chilean modern pentathlete
 Julio Fuentes (footballer) (born 1968), Uruguayan football manager and former footballer
 Julio Fuentes, a recurring character on the 1970s American television show Sanford and Son